Mary Kenneth Keller, B.V.M. (December 17, 1913 – January 10, 1985) was an American Catholic religious sister, educator and pioneer in computer science. She was the first person to earn a Ph.D. in computer science in the United States. Keller and Irving C. Tang were the first two recipients of computer science doctorates (Keller's Ph.D. and Tang's D.Sc. were awarded on the same day).

Career
 
Keller was born in Cleveland, Ohio, on December 17, 1913, to John Adam Keller and Catherine Josephine (née Sullivan) Keller. She entered the Sisters of Charity of the Blessed Virgin Mary in 1932 and took her vows with that religious congregation in 1940.  She completed both her B.S. (Bachelor of Science) in Mathematics in 1943 and her M.S. (Master of Science) in Mathematics and Physics in 1953 from DePaul University in Chicago. Keller earned her Ph.D. (Doctor of Philosophy) from the University of Wisconsin–Madison in 1965. Her dissertation, Inductive Inference on Computer Generated Patterns, focused on "constructing algorithms that performed analytic differentiation on algebraic expression, written in CDC FORTRAN 63."
 
Throughout Keller's graduate studies, she was affiliated with various institutions including the University of Michigan, Purdue, and Dartmouth. Many sources claim that Keller began working at the National Science Foundation workshop in 1958 in the computer science center at Dartmouth College, a male-only institution at the time, where she participated in the implementation of the first DTSS BASIC kernel for the language, working under John G. Kemeny and Thomas E. Kurtz along with about a dozen other students. But this cannot be correct since Dartmouth did not acquire its first computer until 1959. Keller in fact was at Dartmouth sometime in 1961 when Dartmouth ALGOL 30 was being developed and used in undergraduate education.

Keller believed in the potential for computers to increase access to information and promote education. After finishing her doctorate in 1965, Keller founded the computer science department at Clarke College (now Clarke University), a Catholic women's college founded by Sisters of Charity of the Blessed Virgin Mary in Dubuque, Iowa. That same year, that National Science Foundation awarded her a grant of $25,000 payable over two years for "instructional equipment for undergraduate education." One of the first computer science departments at a small college, Keller directed this department for twenty years. Clarke College now has the Keller Computer Center and Information Services, which is named after her and which provides computing and telecommunication support to Clarke College students, faculty members, and staff. The college has also established the Mary Kenneth Keller Computer Science Scholarship in her honor.

Keller was an advocate for the involvement of women in computing and the use of computers for education. She helped to establish the Association of Small Computer Users in Education (ASCUE). She went on to write four books in the field. At the ACM/SIGUCC User Services Conference in 1975, Keller declared "we have not fully used a computer as the greatest interdisciplinary tool that has been invented to date."

Keller died on January 10, 1985, at the age of 71.

Bibliography
  (Doctoral Dissertation)
 Computer graphics and applications of matrix methods : three dimensional computer graphics and projections by   Mary K Keller; Consortium for Mathematics and Its Applications (U.S.); Undergraduate Mathematics and Its Applications Project (U.S.) Lexington, MA : COMAP/UMAP, 1983. U106, U110.
 Electrical circuits and Applications of matrix methods : analysis of linear circuits   Mary K Keller; Consortium for Mathematics and Its Applications (U.S.); Undergraduate Mathematics and Its Applications Project (U.S.), 1978.  U108.
 Food service management and Applications of matrix methods : food service and dietary requirements by   Mary K Keller; Consortium for Mathematics and Its Applications (U.S.); Undergraduate Mathematics and Its Applications Project (U.S.) Lexington, MA : COMAP/UMAP, 1983. U105, U109.
 Markov chains and applications of matrix methods : fixed point and absorbing Markov chains by   Mary K Keller; Consortium for Mathematics and Its Applications (U.S.); Undergraduate Mathematics and Its Applications Project (U.S.) Lexington, MA : COMAP/UMAP, 1983. U107, U111.

See also
 Timeline of women in science
 BASIC (programming language)

References

1913 births
1985 deaths
20th-century American Roman Catholic nuns
American women computer scientists
American computer scientists
University of Wisconsin–Madison College of Letters and Science alumni
DePaul University alumni
Clarke University faculty
People from Dubuque, Iowa
20th-century American women scientists
American computer programmers
Programming language designers
Software engineers
Catholics from Iowa
BASIC programming language